Jassic is an extinct dialect of the Ossetian language once spoken in Hungary, named after the Jasz people, a nomadic tribe that settled in Hungary in the 13th century.

History
The Jasz (Jassic) people came to Hungary together with the Cumans, chased by the Mongols. They were admitted by the Hungarian king Béla IV, hoping that they would assist in fighting against a Mongol-Tatar invasion. But shortly after their entry, the relationship worsened dramatically between the Hungarian nobility and the Cumanian-Jassic tribes and they left the country. After the end of the Mongol-Tatar occupation they returned and were settled in the central part of the Hungarian Plain.

Initially, their main occupation was animal husbandry. During the next two centuries they were assimilated into the Hungarian population and their language disappeared, but they preserved their Jassic identity and their regional autonomy until 1876. Over a dozen settlements in Central Hungary (e.g. Jászberény, Jászárokszállás, and Jászfényszaru) still bear their name. The historical, ethnographical and geographical region of Jászság, as well as of the modern Jász-Nagykun-Szolnok County, are among the many place names linked to them. The name of the city of Iași in Romania may also derive from the name of the people.

The only literary record of the Jassic language was found in the 1950s in the Hungarian National Széchényi Library. It is a one-page glossary containing 34 words mainly related to products of agriculture (types of grain, cattle, etc.) probably compiled for fiscal or mercantile purposes. The glossary was interpreted with the help of Ossetian analogues from the Digor dialect. (Németh 1959)

See also
Jasz (Jassic) people

References

 Németh, J. 1959. "Eine Wörterliste der Jassen, der ungarländischen Alanen." Abhandlungen der Deutschen Akademie der Wissenschaften zu Berlin. Klasse für Sprachen, Literatur, und Kunst, Jahrgang 1958, Nr. 4. Berlin: Akademie-Verlag.
 Kim, Ronald. "On the Historical Phonology of Ossetic." Journal of the American Oriental Society, Vol. 123, No. 1. (Jan.-Mar.,2003), pp. 43–72.

Eastern Iranian languages
13th century in Hungary
Extinct languages of Europe
Languages extinct in the 15th century